Hao Xingchen is a former Chinese professional footballer  who played as a forward.

Club career
Hao Xingchen started his professional career with Dalian Shide F.C. and would make his debut on October 31, 2009 in a league game against Qingdao Jonoon in a 3-1 defeat.

In March 2014, Hao transferred to China League Two side Dalian Transcendence.

Following the dissolve of Dalian Transcendence, Hao decided to retire.

References

External links

1987 births
Living people
Chinese footballers
Footballers from Dalian
Dalian Shide F.C. players
Dalian Transcendence F.C. players
Chinese Super League players
China League One players
Association football forwards
21st-century Chinese people